Adilson Cândido de Souza (born 28 May 1974) is a retired Brazilian association football goalkeeper.

Career

Adílson played with Atlético Mineiro, Palmeiras - MT, Sãocarlense, FC Botafogo, Rio Branco and Ceará.

Adílson fans refer to him as The big wall, because he has accomplished several difficult saves. He completed 200 games against the Itapipoca team, wearing the Alvinegro shirt.

Adílson played with the champion team, Porangabussu, in 2006 and defended a penalty levied by Rinaldo, the striker from their biggest rival.

Career statistics

1 2008 Campeonato Cearense statistics not known
2Include 24 appearances in 2009 Campeonato Cearense

References

External links

 
 
 

Living people
Brazilian footballers
Clube Atlético Mineiro players
Ceará Sporting Club players
Esporte Clube Santo André players
Campeonato Brasileiro Série B players
Association football goalkeepers
1974 births
Sportspeople from Minas Gerais